Tharamangalam (also transliterated as Taramangalam) is a Municipality in Salem district in the Indian state of Tamil Nadu.

Geography 
It is located about 27 km in the west of Salem City, in the district of Salem in northwestern Tamil Nadu.

Climate 
Tharamangalam has a pleasant climate due to the trees in and around the town. The average annual rainfall is about 860.2 mm with the maximum temperature being approx. 39.1 °C and minimum around 19.7 °C.

Demographics 
 India census, Tharamangalam had a population of 22,502. Males constitute 52% of the population and females 48%. Tharamangalam has an average literacy rate of 59%, lower than the national average of 59.5%: male literacy is 66%, and female literacy is 51%. In Tharamangalam, about 12% of the population is under 6 years of age.

Governance 
Tharamangalam is a Town Panchayat, Its 18 wards include Tharamangalam Ward No 05 (the most populous with a population of 3566) and Tharamangalam Ward No 08 (the least populous ward with a population of 326). Tharamangalam is also a revenue block of Salem district, This revenue block consist of 17 panchayat villages and their population.

Tharamangalam is a Sankari assembly constituency and a part of Namakkal (Lok Sabha constituency). Some residents of Tharamangalam are demanding taluk status. Tharamangalam was Taramangalam (state assembly constituency) up to the 2006 election.

Market 
Thursday Weekly Market is in the main squares of the town.

Kamaraj Daily Market is near the bus stand. A supermarket is available inside the town.

Education

Higher Secondary Schools 

 Sengunthar Mahajana Higher Secondary School
 Sengunthar Matriculation Higher Secondary School
 Govt Girls Higher Secondary School
 Srii Jothi Higher Secondary School
 Vethattiri Matriculation Higher Secondary School

Secondary school 

 Sengunthar Public School (CBSE)
 Vanniya Kula Shatriyan School.
 St Charles Matriculation School

Upper Primary school 

 Panchayat Union Middle School
 Kids College Tharamangalm

Primary schools 

 Sengunthar Gurkul
 N S Paattappan Vidyalaya
 Panchayat Union Elementary Schools

Colleges 

 Sengunthar Teacher Training Institute
 Sengunthar College of Education
 Sri Jaya Jothi College Of Education
 Sri Vetrivel College Of Education

The town has a small public library in the center of town.

Sports 
Cricket is a common sport. Basketball and kabaddi are popular as well. The are two parks are Ariyaputhra mudaliyar Park and Kailasanathar Temple Park.

Healthcare 
Tharamangalam has good medical facilities, both government and private care centres including Siddha. Meditation centres are available: Vethathiri maharishi meditation centre, Sri Sri guruji Nithyananda peetham, and Hare Krishna meditation centre.

 Tharamangalam Government Hospital (G.H)
 Animal husbandry & veterinary hospital-Sankari main road.

There are many Private Hospitals available in town.

References 

Cities and towns in Salem district